Famous may refer to:

Companies
 Famous Brands, a South African restaurant franchisor
 Famous Footwear, an American retail store chain
 Famous Music, the music publishing division of Paramount Pictures
 Famous Studios, the animation division of Paramount Pictures from 1942 to 1967

Music
Famous?, an album by JME
Famous (Marques Houston album), 2013
Famous (Puddle of Mudd album)
"Famous" (Puddle of Mudd song), 2007
Famous (Taemin EP), 2019
"Famous" (Charli XCX song), 2015
"Famous" (French Montana song), 2017
"Famous" (Kanye West song), 2016
"Famous" (Mason Ramsey song), 2018
"Famous" (Nathan Sykes song), 2016
"Famous" (Play song), 2010
"Famous" (Scouting for Girls song)
"Famous" (Tinchy Stryder song), 2010
"Famous", a song by Inna from her album Party Never Ends

Other uses
 Charles W. Famous (1875–1938), American politician and physician
 Lisa Picard Is Famous, also known as Famous, a 2000 film
 Famous, Missouri, a community in the United States

See also 
 Fame (disambiguation)
 Celebrity
Notability